Jonathan Renato Barbosa (born 10 July 1991), known as Jonathan Cafú or simply Cafú, is a Brazilian professional footballer who plays as either a winger or a forward for Cuiabá, on loan from Corinthians.

Club career

Brazil
Born in Piracicaba, São Paulo, Cafú graduated from Rio Claro's youth setup. He made his senior debuts with Desportivo Brasil in 2009, appearing regularly.

In 2011 Cafú signed for Boavista, but appeared in only one match for the club during his spell (a 1–1 Campeonato Carioca home draw against América-RJ on 19 January). He moved to XV de Piracicaba in the following year, only being regularly used in 2014, after a short loan period at Capivariano.

In April 2014, although being linked to Italian and Japanese clubs, Cafú joined Série B side Ponte Preta. He made his debut for the club on 21 May, starting in a 1–0 home win against Vila Nova.

Cafú appeared in 32 matches for Macaca, scoring six goals (his first being on 31 May, the winner against Boa Esporte), as his side returned to Série A at first attempt. On 14 January 2015, he signed a three-year deal with São Paulo, for a R$ 3 million fee.

Ludogorets Razgrad
On 27 July 2015, Jonathan Cafú moved abroad to Europe to join Bulgarian side Ludogorets Razgrad for a record club fee of €2.2 million. On 8 August, Cafú played full 90 minutes for Ludogorets's reserve team in a league fixture against Vereya of the B Group. He made his first team debut on 12 September 2015, coming on as a first half substitute in a 0–0 away draw against Beroe Stara Zagora. Cafú eventually appeared in 24 matches for Ludogorets during the season and contributed with 8 goals for the club's 2015-16 A Group title.

In the 2016–17 UEFA Champions League third qualifying round, Cafú scored two goals in the 6–4 overall win against Red Star Belgrade, that propelled Ludogorets into the play-offs of the tournament, the second of which came after a remarkable solo effort in the away match, as Cafú overcame five players of the Serbian team to equalize for 1–1. In the group stage of the tournament, the Brazilian scored the only goal against Basel in the first away match that finished in a 1–1 draw. His good performances continued as he scored a goal and provided an assist to Claudiu Keșerü to give his team a 2–0 lead in the home match against Arsenal, which Ludogorets eventually lost by 2–3. He finished the season scoring 10 goals in 30 league appearances.

Girondins Bordeaux
In August 2017, Cafú moved to Ligue 1 club Bordeaux for a reported fee of €7.5 million. He was given the number 22 shirt. In January 2018, Cafu along with teammates Malcom and Otávio Henrique Santos faced disciplinary sanctions from the team management after a video was uploaded to Instagram by Malcom. The video had been uploaded shortly after a loss to Caen, which had left the team in danger of relegation from Ligue 1 to Ligue 2. Coach Jocelyn Gourvennec was subsequently sacked.

Loan to Red Star Belgrade
Cafu joined Red Star Belgrade on a one-year loan deal in August 2018. On 15 September 2018, he scored his first goal for Red Star in a 6–0 home victory against Radnik Surdulica.

Loan to Al-Hazem
On 28 January 2020, Jonathan Cafú joined Al-Hazem on loan from Bordeaux.

Corinthians
Cafú rescinded his contract with Bourdeaux and joined Corinthians on a three-year contract.

Career statistics

Club

Honours

Club
Ludogorets
 Bulgarian First Professional League (2): 2015–16, 2016–17

Red Star Belgrade
 Serbian SuperLiga: 2018–19

Cuiabá
 Campeonato Mato-Grossense: 2021

Individual
 Best foreign player in the Bulgarian First League: 2016

References

External links
 São Paulo official profile 
 
 

1991 births
Living people
People from Piracicaba
Footballers from São Paulo (state)
Brazilian footballers
Association football wingers
Campeonato Brasileiro Série A players
Campeonato Brasileiro Série B players
First Professional Football League (Bulgaria) players
Second Professional Football League (Bulgaria) players
Ligue 1 players
Serbian SuperLiga players
Saudi Professional League players
Desportivo Brasil players
Boavista Sport Club players
Esporte Clube XV de Novembro (Piracicaba) players
Capivariano Futebol Clube players
Associação Atlética Ponte Preta players
São Paulo FC players
PFC Ludogorets Razgrad players
FC Girondins de Bordeaux players
Red Star Belgrade footballers
Al-Hazem F.C. players
Sport Club Corinthians Paulista players
Cuiabá Esporte Clube players
Brazilian expatriate footballers
Brazilian expatriate sportspeople in Bulgaria
Brazilian expatriate sportspeople in France
Brazilian expatriate sportspeople in Serbia
Brazilian expatriate sportspeople in Saudi Arabia
Expatriate footballers in Bulgaria
Expatriate footballers in France
Expatriate footballers in Serbia
Expatriate footballers in Saudi Arabia